Dominic Adiyiah (born 29 November 1989) is a Ghanaian professional footballer who plays as a striker.

Club career

Early career
Adiyiah began his football career at Feyenoord Ghana. He spent several years in Gomoa Fetteh, where the academy is based, before transferring to Heart of Lions in 2007. After making his debut in the Ghana Premier League with the club based in Kpandu, at the end of the 2007–08 season he was named Most Exciting Player of the league.

Fredrikstad
In August 2008, Adiyiah made the move to Europe, being signed by Norwegian top flight club Fredrikstad for a fee of only £100k (approx. €125k as of that date). He made his debut for the club in an away match against Aalesund, on 30 August. He went scoreless in four appearances during the 2008 season, as the team finished second in the league.

The following season, he scored twice during the training camp, but did not scored in the four league matches he appeared. He also made his debut in the Europa League, in the second leg of the third qualifying round against Lech Poznań.

Milan
In late October 2009, after impressing in the U-20 World Cup, Adiyiah was reported to be close to joining Serie A club Milan. Speculation increased as Fredrikstad announced they had received a bid €500k for the young striker from a big European club. The rumour was eventually confirmed by Milan CEO Adriano Galliani on 1 November, and six days later the Ghanaian signed his new contract, as he had passed routine medical examinations.

The move was ratified on 2 January 2010, the first day of the winter transfer window. However Adiyiah was still not able to play, since he was called up by the Ghana national team to take part in the African Nations Cup. Upon his return, a month later, he also secured an Italian work permit, which he was still lacking, thus becoming definitively eligible to play. Despite this, he was never selected by head coach Leonardo during the remainder of the 2009–10 season. On 25 June 2012, Adiyiah completed a three-year contract with Arsenal Kyiv, ending his three years career with AC Milan.

Partizan (loan)
Subsequently, Adiyiah was sent to Serbian SuperLiga club Partizan on another loan deal until the end of the season where he joined his national teammate Prince Tagoe.

Karşıyaka (loan)
In the 2011 summer transfer window he signed a loan-deal with Karşıyaka who play in Bank Asya 1. Lig, Turkey's second-tier league.

Arsenal Kyiv

However, in February 2012 he was called back from Karşıyaka, due to lack of playing time and loaned to Ukrainian Premier League side Arsenal Kyiv. On 25 June 2012, Adiyiah completed a three-year contract with Arsenal Kyiv, after spending three years with AC Milan.

Atyrau
In June 2014, Adiyiah signed for Kazakhstan Premier League side FC Atyrau.

Nakhon Ratchasima
In February 2015, Adiyiah signed for Thai Premier League side Nakhon Ratchasima F.C. After a successful season where Nakon Ratchasima reached 8th place Adiyiah announced that he would be leaving the club at the end of his contract. He later changed his mind however and agreed to stay at Nakhon Ratchasima for another season.

International career

Ghana U-20
Adiyiah started to be called up by the Black Satellites in 2008, making his debut on 30 March, in a match against Niger, and also participating in the WAFU U-20 Championship. The following year, he was part of the squad that won the African Youth Championship. His successful 2009 was not over: in October, he took part also in the U-20 World Cup held in Egypt; as the team went on winning the trophy, he was awarded the Golden Shoe for the top-scorer with 8 goals in 7 games and was also named the Most Valuable Player of the tournament.

Ghana
Adiyiah earned his first call-up with the Black Stars on 3 November 2009, shortly after the U-20 triumph, for a World Cup qualification match against Mali, to be played on 15 November. However, he was left as an unused substitute. He did make his senior debut three days later though, in a friendly against Angola. In January 2010, he was part of the Ghanaian team that reached the final at the African Nations Cup. Despite making only two substitute appearances, he showed glimpses of a player for the future.

In June of the same year, Adiyiah was called up to take part in the upcoming World Cup, to be played in South Africa. He made his debut in the competition during the last match of the group stage against Germany, coming off the bench for the final minutes. After being left as an unused substitute in the round of 16, he was sent on in the quarter-finals against Uruguay. In the very last minute of extra time, Adiyiah's header was saved on the line by Uruguyan striker Luis Suárez, who palmed the ball away with both his hands, resulting in a penalty kick for Ghana and Suarez being sent off. However, Asamoah Gyan smashed the penalty against the bar and the game went to the shootout. Adiyiah took the fourth penalty with his team trailing 2–3, but had his shot saved; Sebastián Abreu seized the chance by subsequently scoring the deciding penalty for Uruguay.

Career statistics

International

Honours
Partizan

 Serbian SuperLiga: 2010–11
 Serbian Cup: 2010–11
Ghana U20
 FIFA U-20 World Cup: 2009
 African Youth Championship: 2009

Ghana
 Africa Cup of Nations runner-up: 2010
Individual
Ghana Premier League Most Exciting Player: 2007–08
FIFA U-20 World Cup Golden Ball: 2009
FIFA U-20 World Cup Golden Shoe: 2009
CAF Young Player of the Year: 2009
Ghana Player of the Year: 2009

References

External links
 Dominic Adiyiah at Assocalciatori.it 
 
 
 
 

1989 births
Living people
Footballers from Accra
Ghanaian footballers
Association football forwards
Ghana under-20 international footballers
Ghana international footballers
2010 Africa Cup of Nations players
2010 FIFA World Cup players
West African Football Academy players
Heart of Lions F.C. players
Ghana Premier League players
Fredrikstad FK players
Eliteserien players
A.C. Milan players
Reggina 1914 players
Serie B players
Karşıyaka S.K. footballers
TFF First League players
FK Partizan players
Serbian SuperLiga players
FC Arsenal Kyiv players
Ukrainian Premier League players
FC Atyrau players
Kazakhstan Premier League players
Ghanaian expatriate footballers
Ghanaian expatriate sportspeople in Italy
Ghanaian expatriate sportspeople in Norway
Ghanaian expatriate sportspeople in Serbia
Ghanaian expatriate sportspeople in Thailand
Ghanaian expatriate sportspeople in Ukraine
Ghanaian expatriate sportspeople in Turkey
Ghanaian expatriate sportspeople in Kazakhstan
Expatriate footballers in Italy
Expatriate footballers in Norway
Expatriate footballers in Serbia
Expatriate footballers in Ukraine
Expatriate footballers in Turkey
Expatriate footballers in Kazakhstan
Expatriate footballers in Thailand
Dominic Adiyiah